Azbukovica is a highland area in western Serbia, on the border with Bosnia and Herzegovina. River Drina separates Azbukovica from municipalities of Srebrenica and Bratunac. Borders: to the northwest - municipality of Mali Zvornik, to the north - municipality of Krupanj, to the northeastern - municipality of Osečina, to the east - municipality of Valjevo, and to the south - municipality of Bajina Bašta. The highest peak is Tornička Bobija 1272 meters high on the mountain Bobija. Several torrential rivers, flowing into the Drina, intersect Azbukovica. The most famous rivers are Trešnjica and Ljuboviđa. In the late Ottoman period, the region was administratively part of the Sokol nahiya (Sokolska nahija).

References 

Geographical regions of Serbia